Eagle Family Foods Group LLC, is an American food manufacturer based in Cleveland, Ohio. The company was established in 2015 by Paul Smucker Wagstaff after acquiring ownership of the Borden canned milk brands (Eagle Brand, Magnolia, Milnot, PET).

Eagle Family Foods' product line include condensed and evaporated milk, popcorn, french fries,sweet onion sticks, and pasta dishes.

History 
Roots to Eagle Brand can be traced to 1856, when Gail Borden introduced Eagle Brand in 1856 to develop a refrigeration and food preservation system, with its condensed milk as the flagship of the company. Then Borden established his own company, Borden, Inc., one year later. In 1874, Eagle Brand became the first registered trademark in the then-British colony of Hong Kong. In East Asian markets (exclude South Korea), Eagle Brand products are currently produced by Nestlé.

The J.M. Smucker Company bought the canned milk business from Borden in 2007. Eagle Family Foods Group LLC was established after Paul Smucker Wagstaff left The J. M. Smucker Company in 2014 to carry on his own enterprise. He partnered with his friend Jeff Boyle to establish Kelso & Company. It acquired Eagle Brand from The J. M. Smucker Company, establishing Eagle Foods in December 2015.

In August 2016, Eagle Foods acquired the popcorn brand, G.H. Cretors, derived from the Chicago-based manufacturing company Cretors, established in 1885.

Products and brands

 Condensed milk: Eagle Brand, Magnolia
 Evaporated milk: Magnolia, Milnot, PET
 Popcorn: Cretors, Monster Pop!, Popcorn, Indiana
 French fries: Fry Master 
 Snack: Skinny Sticks
 Pasta dishes: Helper, Suddenly Salad

Facilities
 El Paso, Texas – evaporated and condensed milk 
 Seneca, Missouri – evaporated and condensed milk

Closed facilities
These facilities produced Eagle Brand products under Borden Milk:

 Ingersoll, Ontario – Ingersoll Dairy originally supplied Borden's Eagle Brand Condensed Milk
 Toronto, Ontario – supplied Borden's Eagle Brand Condensed Milk in Ontario
 Montreal, Quebec – supplied Borden's Eagle Brand Condensed Milk in Canada
 Chester, South Carolina – supplied Cremora and Cremora Royale worldwide (except South Africa)

See also
 Borden Inc., original company
 Borden Dairy, revived company (2009–)
 Carnation (brand)

References

External links
 

Dairy products companies of the United States
Food product brands
Companies based in Ohio
Gahanna, Ohio
American companies established in 1997
Borden (company)